The Thirty-ninth Oklahoma Legislature was a meeting of the legislative branch of the government of Oklahoma, composed of the Senate and the House of Representatives. It met in Oklahoma City from January 4, 1983, to January 8, 1985, during the term of Governor George Nigh. It was marked by the establishment of the Oklahoma School of Science and Mathematics.

Marvin York served as President pro tempore of the Oklahoma Senate. Daniel Draper served as Speaker of the Oklahoma House of Representatives.

Dates of sessions
First regular session: January 4-June 23, 1983
Special sessions: September 19–23, 1983, and November 28–30, 1983
Second regular session: January 3-May 31, 1984
Previous: 38th Legislature • Next: 40th Legislature

Party composition

Senate

House of Representatives

Major legislation

Enacted
Education - House Bill 1286 established the Oklahoma School of Science and Mathematics in 1983.

Leadership

Democratic leadership
Marvin York served as the President pro tempore of the Oklahoma Senate. Daniel Draper served as Speaker of the Oklahoma House of Representatives during the first regular session, but Jim Barker replaced him and served beginning with the first 1983 special session. Mike Murphy of Idabel, Oklahoma, served as Speaker Pro Tempore.

Republican leadership
Frank W. Davis, of Guthrie, Oklahoma, served as the Republican Minority leader of Oklahoma House of Representatives.

Members

Senate

Tabled based on state almanac.

House of Representatives

Notes

References
 https://www.webcitation.org/6HYhBhiNR?url=http://www.okhouse.gov/Members/Historic.aspx
 http://www.ok.gov/ltgovernor/Office_of_Lieutenant_Governor/History_of_Lieutenant_Governor/
 Speaker of the Oklahoma House of Representatives
 President pro tempore of the Oklahoma Senate

Oklahoma legislative sessions
1983 in Oklahoma
1984 in Oklahoma
1983 U.S. legislative sessions
1984 U.S. legislative sessions